The Road to BAL, also known as the BAL Qualifying Tournaments, are the qualifying tournaments of the Basketball Africa League (BAL). The organization of the qualifiers is in hands of FIBA Africa. The first qualifying rounds were held on 16 October 2019.

The qualifiers are geographically divided into the West and East Division, with three teams qualifying out of each division. Semi-finals and finals are played to determine the winners of the qualifying tournaments.

Format
The national champions of each national federation (associated with FIBA Africa) can sign up for the BAL qualifiers.

In the inaugural edition, a total of 31 teams from 31 countries participate in the qualifying tournaments to determine which six teams will play in the 2020 BAL regular season, along with six directly placed six teams. 

The qualifying tournaments are divided into the first round and the Elite 16; teams are also divided into the East Division and the West Division. Out of each division, three teams advance to the main tournament.

Venues 
The qualifying rounds are usually played in groups of 4 to 6 teams that play each other once in a venue in a predetermined location. 13 arenas in 12 different countries have hosted a stage of the BAL qualifiers. The following arenas have hosted at least one group stage:

Results

East Division

West Division

Performance by country 
Thus far, 9 different clubs from 9 different country have successfully qualified for the BAL. As of the 2023 season, Nigeria, Rwanda, Egypt, Senegal and Tunisia are given a bye for the qualifiers as they qualify directly for the BAL. In 2021, Morocco was also given an automatic spot.

All-time participants 
The following is a list of clubs who have played in the BAL Qualifying Tournaments at any time since its formation in 2019.

All-time record by club
As of 8 October 2022.

Records

Team records 

 Best performance by record:
 Patriots in the 2019 qualification (9–0)
 Largest win
 96 points difference (Ferroviário da Beira 132–36 Roche-Bois Warriors) on October 22, 2021
 83 points difference (Djabal Iconi 37–120 KPA) on October 22, 2022
 77 points difference (KPA 131–54 Usoni Club) on November 1, 2019
 Most points scored in a game
 131 by KPA (131–54 vs. Usoni Club) on November 1, 2019
 Fewest points scored in a game
 36 by Roche-Bois Warriors (vs. Ferroviário da Beira) on October 30, 2019

Individual records 

 Most points scored in a game
 45 by Baraka Athumani, JKT (vs. Dynamo) on October 20, 2019
 40 by Falando Jones, City Oilers (vs. Cape Town Tigers) on November 26, 2022
 39 by Mohamed Ali Halder, Al-Nasr (vs. FAP). on November 26, 2019
 36 by Abdoulaye Harouna (vs. FAP) on November 16, 2022
 36 by Francis Ramanampamonjy Mory, GNBC (vs. KPA) on October 31, 2019
 Most rebounds in a game
 26 by Michael Mukumbutaa, Lions Windhoek (vs. UNZA Pacers) on October 27, 2019
 22 by Ameh Eric Ejeh, ASPAC (vs. Nigelec) on October 30, 2019
 Most assists in a game
 12 by Stephane Mshana, JKT (vs. Dynamo) on October 20, 2019
 Most steals in a game
 9 by Abdoulaye Harouna, Nigelec (vs. FAP) on November 28, 2019
 Most blocks in a game
 7 by Chris Obekpa, SLAC (vs. FAP) on November 16, 2022
 Most 3-point field goals made in a game
 9 by Timothy Kwaor, Nigelec (vs. NPA Pythons) on November 1, 2019

Notes

References

Basketball in Africa
Qualifying